Corliss v. Wenner, 34 P.3d 1100 (Idaho 2001), was a case decided by the Court of Appeals of Idaho that rejected the common law distinctions between lost, mislaid, and abandoned property and treasure trove.

Decision
Four pounds of gold coins dating from 1857 to 1914 were found during the excavation of a driveway in Blaine County, Idaho.  The court awarded the property to the owner of the property where the coins were found, instead of to the finder, and rejected the distinctions between categories of lost property as anachronistic in situations in which personal property is buried or hidden on privately owned realty. .

References

External links
 

Personal property law of the United States
Treasure troves
2001 in United States case law
Idaho state case law
2001 in Idaho
Blaine County, Idaho
Law articles needing an infobox